According to ancient customs in Thailand, there is an astrological rule (which has influence from Hindu mythology) that assigns a color to each day of the week based on the color of the God who protects the day or Navagraha. For example, the God of Sunday is Surya who has the color red. These colors of the day are traditional Thai birthday colors. As King Bhumibol and his son were born on Mondays, Thailand is decorated with yellow on their birthdays. Thai people often wear clothes corresponding to the color of the day.

See also
Thai solar calendar
Royal Flags of Thailand

References 

Technical factors of astrology
Thai culture